Aboubacar Camara (born 1 June 1993), most known as Bouba or Buba, is a Guinean footballer who plays as a goalkeeper.

Club career
Born in Conakry, Bouba moved to Spain in 2011, and signed with CD Alcoyano. He made his senior debuts with the reserves in 2012–13 season, in the fifth division.

Bouba was promoted for the Valencians' first team in 2013 summer, being the only goalkeeper in all three divisions who kept a clean sheet in the first five games of the season.

On 18 June 2014, Bouba rescinded his link with Alcoyano, and joined fellow league team UCAM Murcia CF shortly after.

International career
After appearing in 2012 Africa Cup of Nations as a third-choice goalkeeper, Bouba made his Guinea debut on 6 February 2013, playing the entire second half in a 1–1 draw against Senegal.

References

External links

1993 births
Living people
Sportspeople from Conakry
Guinean footballers
Guinean expatriate footballers
Association football goalkeepers
Segunda División B players
CD Alcoyano footballers
UCAM Murcia CF players
Expatriate footballers in Spain
2015 Africa Cup of Nations players
Guinea international footballers
Guinea youth international footballers